Revenge of the Mysterons from Mars is a 1981 television film based on the 1960s British puppet TV series Captain Scarlet and the Mysterons created by Gerry and Sylvia Anderson. Produced by the New York office of the series' distributor, ITC Entertainment, the film is a compilation of the Captain Scarlet episodes "Shadow of Fear", "Lunarville 7", "Crater 101" and "Dangerous Rendezvous".

Set in 2068, the original series depicts a "war of nerves" between Earth and the Mysterons: a race of Martians with the power to create functioning copies of destroyed people or objects and use them to carry out acts of aggression against humanity. Earth is defended by a military organisation called Spectrum, whose top agent, Captain Scarlet, was killed by the Mysterons and replaced by a reconstruction that subsequently broke free of their control. Scarlet's double has a self-healing power that enables him to recover from injuries that would be fatal to anyone else, making him Spectrum's best asset in its fight against the Mysterons.

Revenge of the Mysterons from Mars had its first home video release in either 1981 or January 1982. It was followed by another Captain Scarlet compilation, Captain Scarlet vs. the Mysterons. Revenge of the Mysterons from Mars was negatively received by fans of the original Captain Scarlet. In November 1988, it was broadcast as the second episode of the movie-mocking TV series Mystery Science Theater 3000.

Plot
An attempt by Spectrum to survey Mars from space is threatened when the Mysterons murder an astronomer attached to the project and replace him with a doppelganger under their control. Captains Scarlet and Blue (voiced by Francis Matthews and Ed Bishop) track down and kill the reconstruction, but not before it sabotages the mountain observatory that is due to receive the images from the Martian space probe. The observatory is destroyed and the images are lost ("Shadow of Fear").

After the Lunar Controller declares the Moon a neutral party in Earth's struggle with the Mysterons, Scarlet, Blue and Lieutenant Green (voiced by Cy Grant) are sent to lunar colony Lunarville 7 to follow up reports of an unidentified complex being built on the far side of the Moon. They discover that this is a Mysteron installation ("Lunarville 7").

After reporting back to Spectrum, Scarlet, Blue and Green return to the Moon to destroy the Mysteron facility. They successfully extract its pulsating crystal power source, thus disabling its reconstructive capability and allowing it to be permanently destroyed with a nuclear bomb ("Crater 101").

Back on Earth, Dr Kurnitz (voiced by Jeremy Wilkin) finds that the crystal pulsator can be adapted to enable direct communication with the Mysterons. Transmitting to Mars, Spectrum commander-in-chief Colonel White (voiced by Donald Gray) requests an end to the hostilities between humanity and the Mysterons ("Dangerous Rendezvous").

Release and reception
Created by the New York office of ITC Entertainment, Revenge of the Mysterons from Mars was one of several TV film re-workings of Anderson series designed to renew overseas interest in these productions and promote syndication sales in the United States. The films were collectively titled "Super Space Theater".

Following its initial home video release by Precision Video, Revenge of the Mysterons from Mars had two later VHS releases: the first by Channel 5 Video in 1986, the second by PolyGram in 1992. It was also released on Betamax and LaserDisc.

Fred McNamara considers the film "curiously titled" and "thematically" superior to Captain Scarlet vs. the Mysterons.

Mystery Science Theater 3000
On 24 November 1988 (Thanksgiving in the United States), the film was televised as the second episode of the original version of the movie-mocking comedy series Mystery Science Theater 3000, broadcast by Minneapolis TV station KTMA. It formed the second half of a double feature with Invaders from the Deep, a compilation based on the Andersons' earlier series Stingray, which had been shown earlier that day as episode 1.

References

External links

1981 films
1981 television films
1980s English-language films
Alien visitations in films
American films about revenge
American science fiction television films
Captain Scarlet (franchise)
Compilation films
Films set in 2068
Marionette films
Mars in film
Moon in film
Television films based on television series
1980s American films